Philliskirk is a surname. Notable people with the surname include:

Tony Philliskirk (born 1965), English footballer 
Danny Philliskirk (born 1991), English footballer